Frédéric Demontfaucon (born 24 December 1973 in Le Creusot, Saône-et-Loire) is a judoka from France.

Achievements

References 
 
 Profile at L'Equipe.fr

External links
 
 
 Video footage of Frédéric Demontfaucon (judovision.org)

1973 births
Living people
Sportspeople from Le Creusot
French male judoka
Judoka at the 2000 Summer Olympics
Judoka at the 2004 Summer Olympics
Judoka at the 2008 Summer Olympics
Olympic judoka of France
Olympic bronze medalists for France
Olympic medalists in judo
World judo champions
Medalists at the 2000 Summer Olympics
20th-century French people
21st-century French people